Carpilius convexus, the marbled stone crab, is a species of crab that lives in the Indo-Pacific, from Hawaii to the Red Sea and South Africa. It was first described by Peter Forsskål in 1775 as "Cancer convexus", and has sometimes been treated as a variety of the larger species Carpilius maculatus. The biology of the genus Carpilius is poorly known.
A Carpilius convexus coloration is a yellow-brown or red, with patches that are mainly brown, growing up to 25 cm. Despite us knowing their size, coloration, and habitat, little is known about their biology till this day.

References

External links

Carpilius convexus, "Crabs of Japan"
 
  "Carpilius convexus"

Watch
 YouTube: Carpilius convexus, at Night dive.

Gallery

Crabs
Crustaceans described in 1775
Taxa named by Peter Forsskål